was a Japanese organic chemist and marine biologist, and Professor Emeritus at Marine Biological Laboratory (MBL) in Woods Hole, Massachusetts and Boston University School of Medicine. He was awarded the Nobel Prize in Chemistry in 2008 for the discovery and development of green fluorescent protein (GFP) with two American scientists: Martin Chalfie of Columbia University and Roger Tsien of the University of California-San Diego.

Biography 

Born in Fukuchiyama, Kyoto in 1928, Shimomura was brought up in Manchukuo (Manchuria, China) and Osaka, Japan while his father served as an officer in the Imperial Japanese Army. Later, his family moved to Isahaya, Nagasaki, 25 km from the epicenter of the August 1945 atomic bombing of the city. He recalled hearing, as a 16-year-old boy, the bomber plane Bockscar before the atom bomb exploded.  The explosion flash blinded Shimomura for about thirty seconds, and he was later drenched by the "black rain" bomb fallout. He overcame great odds in the following 11 years to earn an education and achieve academic success.

Shimomura's education opportunities were starkly limited in devastated, post-war Japan. Although he later recalled having no interest in the subject, he enrolled in the College of Pharmaceutical Sciences of Nagasaki Medical College (now Nagasaki University School of Pharmaceutical Sciences). The Medical College campus had been entirely destroyed by the atomic bomb blast, forcing the pharmacy school to relocate to a temporary campus near Shimomura's home. This proximity was the fortuitous reason he embarked upon the studies and career which would ultimately lead to unanticipated rewards. Shimomura was awarded a BS degree in pharmacy in 1951, and he stayed on as a lab assistant through 1955.

Shimomura's mentor at Nagasaki helped him find employment as an assistant to Professor Yoshimasa Hirata at Nagoya University in 1956. While working for Professor Hirata, he received a MS degree in organic chemistry in 1958 and, before leaving Japan for an appointment at Princeton University, a Ph.D. in organic chemistry in 1960 at Nagoya University. At Nagoya, Hirata assigned Shimomura the challenging task of determining what made the crushed remains of a type of crustacean (Jp. umi-hotaru, lit. "sea-firefly", Vargula hilgendorfii) glow when moistened with water. This assignment led Shimomura to the successful identification of the protein causing the phenomenon, and he published the preliminary findings in the Bulletin of the Chemical Society of Japan in a paper titled "Crystalline Cypridina luciferin." The article caught the attention of Professor Frank Johnson at Princeton University, and Johnson successfully recruited Shimomura to work with him in 1960.

Study
Shimomura worked in the Department of Biology at Princeton for Professor Johnson to study the bioluminescent jellyfish Aequorea victoria, which they collected during many summers at the Friday Harbor Laboratories of the University of Washington. In 1962, their work culminated in the discovery of the proteins aequorin and green fluorescent protein (GFP) in A. victoria; for this work, he was awarded a third of the Nobel Prize in Chemistry in 2008.

Family
His wife, Akemi, whom Shimomura met at Nagasaki University, is also an organic chemist and was a partner in his research activities. Their son, Tsutomu Shimomura, is a computer security expert who was involved in the arrest of Kevin Mitnick. Their daughter, Sachi Shimomura, is director of Undergraduate Studies for the English Department at Virginia Commonwealth University and the author of Odd Bodies and Visible Ends in Medieval Literature.

Recognition
 2004 – Pearse Prize, Royal Microscopical Society
 2005 – Emile Chamot Award
 2006 – Asahi Prize
 2008 – Nobel Prize in Chemistry
 2008 – Order of Culture
 2008 – Person of Cultural Merit
 2012 – Golden Goose Award
 2013 – Member of the United States National Academy of Sciences
 2018 – Junior third rank (posthumous)

Selected publications
Bioluminescence: Chemical Principles and Methods (Revised Edition) (WSPC 2012) .

See also

 List of Japanese Nobel laureates
 Kamo Aquarium

References

Sources
 including the Nobel lecture Discovery of Green Fluorescent Protein, GFP

Japanese chemists
2018 deaths
1928 births
Organic chemists
People from Kyoto Prefecture
Boston University School of Medicine faculty
Nobel laureates in Chemistry
Japanese Nobel laureates
Recipients of the Order of Culture
Foreign associates of the National Academy of Sciences
Nagoya University alumni
Hibakusha
Nagasaki University alumni